Saint-Pamphile is a town in the Canadian province of Quebec situated in the L'Islet Regional County Municipality in the Chaudière-Appalaches administrative district. While the official municipal territory ends at the Canada–United States border located at the eastern end of town, there is a tiny hamlet located immediately east of the border, known as St-Pamphile, Maine. The hamlet is historically part of the larger entity located in Quebec and is considered integral part of the town by locals. The economy of St-Pamphile, Maine is entirely dependent upon the economy of St-Pamphile, Quebec, from which Maine residents obtain goods and services, and sometimes even employment. Saint-Pamphile, Quebec is the central town of 7 neighboring parishes, and provides a CLSC, elementary school, and high school for the area.

History
The first settler in the town was Frédéric Vaillancourt from the nearby Saint-Aubert municipality in the year 1859. Given that the surrounding land appeared to be fertile amongst a mostly rocky landscape, many settlers followed his lead, and in 1870, Saint-Pamphile became a parish. In 1889, the area was officially declared a municipality. It wasn't until 1963 that Saint-Pamphile was granted the legal status of city.

The community was named in tribute to Pamphile-Gaspard Verreault, a notary who represented L'Islet in the Legislative Assembly of Quebec from 1867 to 1878.

Demographics 

Economy

The Saint Pamphile Border Crossing connects Canada and the United States. It is at a logging yard; the main economic activity of the region is timber. There are two major companies present who deal with raw materials: Maibec and Matériaux Blanchet.

Tourism
The lumberjack festival is always held in the last full weekend of August. It showcases a variety of sporting activities that call to mind the dominance of forestry in the region. At the event, one may watch forestry competitions and shows (comedy, music, dance, among others) Other activities include barbecues, picnics, golf tournaments, and so on, and the gathering attracts more than 25,000 visitors annually.

In mid-February, another event takes place in St-Pamphile, known as the Appalachian Odyssey. In addition to the dog sled tracks, there are also many other competitions during the event. This annual event gains popularity every year.

See also
L'Islet Regional County Municipality
Gobeil River
Big Black River (Saint John River)
List of municipalities in Quebec

References

Cities and towns in Quebec
Incorporated places in Chaudière-Appalaches